This is a list of major  libraries in Pakistan.

Sindh

Karachi
 Al-Firdous Baldia Public Library, Baldia Town
 Al-Huda Library, Nazimabad
 Allama Iqbal Library
 Allama Shabir Ahmad Usmani Library, Nazimabad
 Baba-e-Urdu Kutubkhana
 Bedil Library, Sharfabad Gulshan Town
 Board of Intermediate Karachi Library, North Nazimabad
 Central Library, Korangi No.5, Korangi
 Children Library, Nazimabad
 Community Center, Gulshan Town
 Defence Central Library DHA
 Dr. Mahmood Hussain Central Library, University of Karachi, Gulshan Town
 Edhi Library, Gulshan-e-Iqbal, WS-9/12, Main University Road, Gulshan Town
 Faiz-e-Aam Library, Lyari Town
 Faran Club Library, Gulshan Town
 Ghalib Library, Nazimabad	
 Ghulam Husain Khaliq Dina Hall Library, Saddar Town
 Hashim Gazder Library, Jamila Street, Ranchore Lines
 Hasrat Mohani Library,  Liaquatabad No.9, Liaquatabad
 Hungooraabad Library, Hungooraabad, Lyari Town
 Ibrahim Ali Bhai Auditorium & Library
 Iqbal Shaheed Library, Behar Colony, Lyari Town
 Iqra Library, New Kumhar Wara, Lyari Town
 Jehangir Park Reading Room Library, Jehangir Park, Saddar Town
 Karachi Metropolitan Corporation Library, Shahrah-e-Liaquat, Saddar Town
 KMC Children Library, near Hadi Market, Nazimabad
 KMC Library
 Kutub Khana Khas Anjuman-e-Taraqqi-e-Urdu Pakistan, Baba-e-Urdu Road, Saddar Town
 Liaquat Hall Library, Abdullah Haroon Road, Saddar Town
 Liaquat Memorial Library, Stadium Road, Gulshan Town
 Lyari Municipal Library, Old Salater House, Lyari Town
 Lyari Text Book Library, Chakiwara, Lyari Town
 Main Library, Aga Khan University, Stadium Road, Gulshan Town
 Main Library, Hamdard University, Madina-tal-Hikmat, Muhammad Bin Qasim Avenue, Karachi, Sindh 
 Main Library, NED University of Engineering & Technology, Karachi, Sindh 
 Mansoora Library, Dastagir Society, Federal B. Area
 Moosa Lane Reading Room Library, Moosa Lane, Lyari Town
 Moulana Hasrat Mohani Library, Usmanabad, Lyari Town
 Mujahid Park Library, Rexer Line, Lyari Town
 Nasir-Arif Hussain Memorial Library & Research Center, Gulberg Town
 National Book Foundation Library
 Nawa Lane Library, Gabol Park, Lyari Town
 Noorani Welfare Library, Ranchore Line, Lyari Town
 Pakistan Arab Cultural Association Library, Iftikhar Chambers, Altaf Road, P.O. Box 5752, Karachi, Sindh 
 Pakistan National Centre Library
 Rangoon Wala Hall and Community Centre Library, Dhoraji Colony	
 Sardar Abdul-Rab Nishtar Library, near Lyari General Hospital, Lyari Town
 Satellite Library, Sango Lane, Lyari Town
 Shia Imami Ismaili community libraries in different areas of Karachi; Kharader Library and Reading Room established 1908, the first library in Karachi; its academic library also, Kharadar Ismaili Jamat Khana	
 Sheikh Mufeed Library, Islamic Research Center, Allama Ibne Hassan Jarchvi Road, Federal B. Area
 Shohada-e-Pakistan Library, Usmanabad, Lyari Town
 Sindh Archives, Clifton Town
 Super Market Library, Super Market, Liaquatabad
 Syed Mehmood Shah Library, Lee Market, Lyari Town
 Taimuriya Library North Nazimabad
 Umer Lane Library, Umer Lane, Lyari Town

Jacobabad
  Abdul Karim Gadai Municipal Library, Municipal Committee Building, Jacobabad, Sindh

Khyber Pakhtunkhwa

Peshawar
  Main Library, University of Agriculture, Peshawar
  Main Library, University of Engineering & Technology, Peshawar
  Main Library, University of Peshawar, Peshawar
  Municipal Corporation Library, Peshawar City, Peshawar
  Nishtar Municipal Public Library, Town Hall, G. T. Road, Peshawar
 Central Sciences Degree College Library,  Peshawar
 Islamia College University Central Library Peshawar

Mardan
  Cantonment Library, Cantonment Board, Mardan
  Mardan Public Library, Directorate of Archives, Shami Road, Mardan

Abbottabad
  Main Library, Pakistan Military Academy, Abbottabad
  Municipal Committee Library, Abbottabad
  Municipal Library, Company Garden, Abbottabad

Dera Ismail Khan
  Main Library, Gomal University Dera Ismail Khan
  Municipal Central Library, Town Hall, Dera Ismail Khan

Kohat
  Jinnah Municipal Library, Shah Faisal Gate, Kohat

Topi
  Main Library, Ghulam Ishaq Khan Institute of Engineering & Technology, Topi District-Swabi

Risalpur

  Main Library, Military College of Engineering, Risalpur

Mansehra

  Municipal Committee Library, Mansehra

Mingora

  Municipal Public Library, Mingora

  Swat Public Library, Swat (http://www.kppls.pk/)

Bannu

  Municipal Public Library, Bannu

Public Libraries Network

Main Public Library and Archive in Khyber Pakhtunkhwa is the Directorate of Archives & Libraries, Jail Road Peshawar. It has now developed its 
District or Branch Libraries in different districts of Khyber Pakhutnkhwa. These libraries in future will be like the chain of one Big network of Public Libraries and Archives. Its district libraries are:
 Timergara Public Library
 Peshawar Public Library
 Mardan Public Library
 Haripur Public Library
 Abbottabad Public Library
 Bannu Public Library
 Laki Marwat Public Library
 DI Khan Public Library
 Kohat Public Library
 Swat Public Library
 Charsada Public Library
 Ghazi Public Library
 Swabi Public Library
 Khushal Khan Khattak memorial Library, Akora Khattak
 Chitral Public Library

Punjab

Mailsi
Masood Jhandir Research Library

Murree
 Iqbal Municipal Library

Chiniot
 Omar Hayat Mahal Library

Bahawalpur
Central Library Bahawalpur
e-Library, Bahawalpur (digital library established by Punjab Information Technology Board and Sports Board Punjab)

Faisalabad
Following are three public libraries in Faisalabad city:
 Allama Iqbal Library
 Municipal Library 
e-Library, Faisalabad (digital library established by Punjab Information Technology Board and Sports Board Punjab)

Toba Tek Singh
 Govt. Public Library, Iqbal Bazaar, Kamalia.
e-Library, Toba Tek Singh (digital library established by Punjab Information Technology Board and Sports Board Punjab)

Lahore
	
	
 Atomic Energy Minerals Centre Library	
 Babar Ali Library, Aitchison College	
 Dr Baqir's Library	
 Dyal Singh Trust Library, established in Lahore in 1908 in pursuance of the will of the Sardar Dyal Singh Majithia; first setup in the Exchange Building, the residence of Sardar Dyal Singh
 The Ewing Memorial Library, built in 1943 and named for Dr. Sir J.C.R. Ewing, the second principal of the college; one of the oldest and best college libraries in Lahore; now gradually transforming itself into a state-of-the-art university library
 Government College Library, Government College University
 Islamia College Library, Islamia College	
 Lahore University of Management Sciences Library, Lahore University of Management Sciences	
 Library Information Services CIIT Lahore	
 National Library of Engineering Sciences,  plays a vital role in achieving the objectives of the institution like study & teaching, research & extension services, and dissemination of information; fully air conditioned with a seating capacity of about 400 readers at its different floors
 Pakistan Administrative Staff College Library	
 People's Bank Library	
 Provincial Assembly of the Punjab Library	
 Punjab Public Library	
 Punjab University Library, Punjab University
 Quaid-e-Azam Library, a highly detailed model of a newly constructed library, named after Quaid-e-Azam Muhammad Ali Jinnah; located in the most famous gardens of Lahore,  named "Lawrence Gardens" by the British.
e-Library, Lahore (digital library established by Punjab Information Technology Board and Sports Board Punjab)

Sahiwal
Government Jinnah Public Library
e-Library, Sahiwal (digital library established by Punjab Information Technology Board and Sports Board Punjab)
Government Urdu Addab Library ( Urdu Literature Library)

Sargodha
Jinnah Hall Library
 Central Library, University of Sargodha
e-Library, Sargodha (digital library established by Punjab Information Technology Board and Sports Board Punjab)

Multan
 Garrison Public Library
e-Library, Multan (digital library established by Punjab Information Technology Board and Sports Board Punjab)

Rawalpindi
 Municipal Library Rawalpindi
 Cantonment Public Library

Balochistan

Quetta
 Buitems Library, Quetta
 Cantonment Public Library, Cantonment Board, Shahrah-e-Aziz Bhatti, Quetta
 Quaid-e-Azam Library, Quetta
 Main Library, University of Balochistan, Quetta

Mastung
 Library of Cadet College, Mastung
 Municipal Public Library, Mastung
 Sarawan digital Library, Mastung

Lasbela
 LUAWMS Library, Lasbela

Winder
 Sassui Library, Winder

Tubat
 Molana Abdul Haq Library, Turbat Kech

Islamabad Capital Territory
Following are some of the public libraries in Islamabad Capital Territory:
 PHRC Central Library
 National Library of Pakistan
 Islamabad Public Library
 Islamabad Community Library,
Sector F-11 Markaz.
 Islamabad Community Library,
Sector G-7, Near Iqbal Hall
 Islamabad Community Library,
Street - 9, Sector G-8/2
 Islamabad Community Library,
Sector G-11 Markaz
 Islamabad Community Library,
Sector I-8 Markaz
 Islamabad Community Library, Street - 57, Sector I-10/1
Institute of Strategic Studies Islamabad, (ISSI Library) Ataturk Avenue, Sector F-5/2, Islamabad
issilibrary.org.pk

See also 
 List of libraries

External links 
 Pakistan Library Network, a list of libraries maintained by PLANWEL	
 Libraries in Karachi	
 Library Information Services, CIIT Lahore

References

Libraries

Pakistan
Libraries